Eckington  may refer to:

England
Eckington, Derbyshire
Eckington, Worcestershire
Eckington, a former name of the village now called Ripe, East Sussex

United States
Eckington (Washington, D.C.), a neighborhood of Washington, D.C.

See also
Heckington